The Parker/Gentry Award, established in 1996 and presented annually by the Field Museum of Natural History, honors an outstanding individual, team or organization in the field of conservation biology whose efforts have had a significant impact on preserving the world's natural heritage and whose actions and approach can serve as a model to others. The award is designed to highlight work that could benefit from wider publicity and fuller dissemination of scientific results.

The award bears the names of the late Theodore A. Parker III and Alwyn Howard Gentry, outstanding conservation biologists, who worked closely with several Field Museum curators, especially through the Rapid Assessment Program (RAP) launched by Conservation International.

Parker, an ornithologist, and Gentry, a botanist, were killed August 3, 1993 when their light plane crashed into a mountainside as they were making a treetop survey of an Ecuadorian cloud forest.

Award winners
 1996 Fernando Rubio, Pronaturaleza, Peru
 1997 Christopher Gordon, Volta Basin Research Project, Ghana
 1998 Randall Borman, Central Cofan Zabalo, Ecuador
 1999 Juan Mayr Maldonado, Fundacion Pro Sierra Nevada de Santa Marta, Colombia
 2000 Louise H. Emmons, United States
 2001 Michael Lannoo, United States
 2002 Los Amigos Team, Cordillera Azul National Park, Peru
 2003 Lorivi Ole Moirana, Tanzania
 2004 Yang Yuming, Yunnan Province, China
 2005 Gary Stiles, Colombia
 2006 Jose "Pepe" Alvarez A., Peru
 2007 Judith Kimerling, United States
 2008 Tim Davenport, Tanzania
 2009 Daniel Rakotondravony, Madagascar
 2010 Therese and John Hart, Réserve de Faune á Okapis, D.R. Congo
 2011 Lester Kaufman, United States
 2012 Nina R. Ingle, Philippines
 2013, W. John Kress, United States
 2014, Rhett Ayers Butler, United States
 2015, Merlijn van Weerd, Netherlands
 2016, Uma Ramakrishnan, India
 2017, David Vaughan, United States
 2018, Instituto del Bien Común, Peru
 2019, Gun Lake Potawatomi, United States
 2020, Michael Goulding, United States
 2021, Fort Belknap Indian Community and American Prairie Reserve

See also
 List of environmental awards

References

Environmental awards
Field Museum of Natural History